The Itaparaná River is a river of Amazonas state in north-western Brazil.
It is a tributary of the Ipixuna River.

The river flows through the Purus-Madeira moist forests ecoregion in its upper reaches.
It flows through the Purus várzea ecoregion, where it joins the Ipixuna shortly before that river joins the Purus River.

See also
List of rivers of Amazonas

References

Sources

Rivers of Amazonas (Brazilian state)